FDOC may refer to:
Florida Department of Citrus
Florida Department of Corrections